Churton is a village and civil parish in the Cheshire West and Chester district, in the county of Cheshire, England. The civil parish was formed from the parishes of Churton by Aldford, Churton by Farndon and Edgerley in 2015.

References 

Villages in Cheshire
Civil parishes in Cheshire
Cheshire West and Chester